Drey Matthew Jameson (born August 17, 1997) is an American professional baseball pitcher for the Arizona Diamondbacks of Major League Baseball (MLB).

Born and raised in Greenfield, Indiana, Jameson played two years of college baseball at Ball State University. The Diamondbacks selected him in the first round of the 2019 MLB draft and he played in their minor league system before making his MLB debut in 2022.

Amateur career
Jameson attended Greenfield-Central High School in Greenfield, Indiana. In 2017, his senior year, he went 6–1 with a 0.65 ERA. He went unselected in the 2017 Major League Baseball draft and thus enrolled at Ball State University where he played college baseball for the Ball State Cardinals.

In 2018, Jameson's freshman season at Ball State, he went 7–2 with a 3.88 ERA over 18 games (12 starts). He was awarded Mid-American Conference (MAC) Freshman Pitcher of the Year. As a sophomore in 2019, he started 16 games and pitched to a 6–3 record with a 3.24 ERA and 146 strikeouts over  innings and was named the MAC Pitcher of the Year.

Professional career
Jameson was selected by the Arizona Diamondbacks in the first round with the 34th overall pick of the 2019 Major League Baseball draft. He signed for $1.4 million and was assigned to the Hillsboro Hops of the Class A-Short Season Northwest League. Over  innings, he gave up eight earned runs, 14 hits, and nine walks, striking out 12. He did not play a minor league game in 2020 due to the cancellation of the minor league season caused by the COVID-19 pandemic. To begin the 2021 season, he returned to Hillsboro, now members of the High-A West. After starting 12 games and pitching to a 2–4 record with a 3.92 ERA and 77 strikeouts over  innings, he was promoted to the Amarillo Sod Poodles of the Double-A Central in late July. Over eight starts with Amarillo, Jameson went 3-2 with a 4.08 ERA and 68 strikeouts over  innings.

Jameson returned to Amarillo to begin the 2022 season. After posting a 2.41 ERA over  innings, he was promoted to the Reno Aces of the Triple-A Pacific Coast League. Over 21 starts with Reno, Jameson went 5-12 with a 6.95 ERA and 109 strikeouts over 114 innings.

On September 15, 2022, the Diamondbacks selected Jameson's contract and promoted him to the major leauges. He made his MLB debut that night as Arizona's starting pitcher versus the San Diego Padres, earning the win after throwing seven scoreless innings in which he allowed no runs, one walk, and two hits in a 4-0 Diamondbacks win.

References

External links

Ball State Cardinals bio

1997 births
Living people
People from Greenfield, Indiana
Baseball players from Indiana
Major League Baseball pitchers
Arizona Diamondbacks players
Ball State Cardinals baseball players
Hillsboro Hops players
Amarillo Sod Poodles players
Reno Aces players